Michael Jenkins Kernan (March 13, 1884 – December 15, 1953) was an American politician from New York.

Life
He was born on March 13, 1884, in Utica, New York, the son of Nicholas Edward Kernan (1845–1902) and Harriet Anne (Jenkins) Kernan (1846–1923). He was an investment broker.

Kernan was a member of the New York State Assembly (Oneida Co., 1st D.) in 1923. On September 25, 1925, he married Katharine Covenhoven Clarke (1886–1969), and they had three children, among them journalist Michael Kernan (1927–2005).

He was a member of the New York State Senate (36th D.) in 1933 and 1934; and was Chairman of the Committee on Affairs of Villages.

He died on December 15, 1953, at his home in Manhattan Beach, California.

U.S. Senator Francis Kernan (1816–1892) was his grandfather.

Sources

1884 births
1953 deaths
Democratic Party New York (state) state senators
Politicians from Utica, New York
Democratic Party members of the New York State Assembly
People from Manhattan Beach, California
20th-century American politicians